The 2023 Arizona State Sun Devils football team will represent Arizona State University as a member of the Pac-12 Conference during the 2023 NCAA Division I FBS football season. The Sun Devils are expected to be led by Kenny Dillingham in his first year as head coach. Dillingham was hired as Arizona State's head coach in late November 2022.

The Sun Devils play their home games at Sun Devil Stadium in Tempe Arizona.

Previous season

References

Arizona State
Arizona State Sun Devils football seasons
Arizona State Sun Devils football